Port Tampa Bay, known as the Port of Tampa until January 2014, is the largest port in the state of Florida and is overseen by the Tampa Port Authority, a Hillsborough County agency. The port is located in Tampa, Florida near downtown Tampa's Channel District. The port directly accesses Tampa Bay on the western coast of the Florida Suncoast, and is approximately 25 sea miles from the Gulf of Mexico. The port district includes parts of Tampa Bay, Hillsborough Bay, McKay Bay, Old Tampa Bay and the Hillsborough River. The port serves container ships, tank ships, and cruise lines.

As of 2013, Port Tampa Bay ranks 16th in the United States by tonnage in domestic trade, 32nd in foreign trade, and 22nd in total trade. It is the largest, most diversified port in Florida, has an economic impact of more than $15.1 billion, and supports over 80,000 jobs. Cargo shipping includes bulk and tanker ships, as well as roll-on/roll-off ships and container cargo ships. The port additionally operates ship repair facilities. Currently connected to major Asian container ports, with global connections, the port is focused on growing its container trade.  Millions of dollars in infrastructure improvements are underway or in the planning phase.

Cargo shipping
Weekly containerized cargo service is available at Port Tampa Bay. Ports America operates two container berths, three gantry cranes, a 100-ton Mobile Harbor Crane and a container terminal. In 2014, the Port spent $21.5 million on two new gantry cranes purchased from Zhenhua, which will be operational in 2016. The shipping companies Zim Integrated Shipping Services, Mediterranean Shipping Company, and COSCO are among those who do business at the port.

The port is also home to Foreign Trade Zone #79. Foreign Trade Zone No. 79 assists companies in Tampa Bay and along the I-4 Corridor in importing, exporting, manufacturing, and distribution activities.

Cruise ships

Tampa is also one of America's most popular departure ports for western Caribbean cruises. Four cruise lines homeport at Port Tampa Bay: Carnival Cruise Lines, Royal Caribbean International, Holland America Line, and Norwegian Cruise Line. AIDA Cruises uses the Port as a port of call. It has three cruise terminals. Fiscal year 2014 saw 888,343 passengers come through the port, encompassing 198 cruise ship calls. Nearby attractions include Channelside, The Florida Aquarium, and Ybor City.

In April 2016, a reversal in Carnival's policy banning Cuban-born Americans from booking cruises to Cuba sparked protests in Miami and at the Port Tampa Bay, where a handful of Cuban-American protesters objected to the Port's ties with Carnival because the company is doing business with the Castro regime. Carnival had initially imposed the ban because Cuban law prohibits Cuban-born people from returning there by sea, even though they can do so on commercial flights, but on April 18 released a statement saying, "All travelers can book its cruises to Cuba, including Cuban-born individuals, in anticipation of Cuba allowing travel on a similar basis as they would if they were traveling by air."

Access
The cruise terminal and port headquarters are located along Channelside Drive. The nearest major highway to the port is the Lee Roy Selmon Expressway, which runs along the northern edge of the port. Elevated, reversible lanes on the expressway run from Meridian Avenue (three blocks west of the cruise terminal) to Interstate 75 and the suburb of Brandon.

A significant amount of truck traffic to and from the port once traveled on the urban streets of Ybor City, one of just two National Historic Districts in Florida. The Interstate 4 – Selmon Expressway Connector, completed in 2013, is a  highway which has exclusive truck lanes to route truck traffic from Interstate 4 directly to Port Tampa Bay, which now allows trucks to bypass city roads and travel directly between the Port and the interstate system.

Leadership

Port Tampa Bay is governed by a board of seven commissioners, five of whom are appointed by Florida's governor, the other two being the current Mayor of Tampa and a member of the Hillsborough County Commission.

Current Members:

Chairman Steve Swindal: Owner of Marine Towing of Tampa, Owner & Founder of  Pan American Sports Group LLC;
Vice Chairman 
Secretary/Treasurer 
Commissioner 
Commissioner 
Tampa Mayor Jane Castor
Commissioner Pat Kemp, Vice Chair, Hillsborough County Board of County Commissioners

Port Tampa Bay's Leadership team can be found here: Port Tampa Bay Leadership

References

External links
 Tampa Port Authority
 Tampa Cruises
 Foreign Trade Zone #79

Transportation in Tampa, Florida
Tampa, Port of
1924 establishments in Florida
Tampa Bay
Transportation buildings and structures in Hillsborough County, Florida
Port authorities in the United States